Duke of Otranto is a hereditary title in the nobility of the First French Empire which was bestowed in 1809 by Emperor Napoleon I upon Joseph Fouché (1759-1820), a French statesman and Minister of Police. Fouché had been made a Count of the French Empire previously.

Background
The dukedom was named after the town of Otranto on the east coast of the Salento peninsula in Italy and created - under the French name of Otrante - as a duché grand-fief (a hereditary but nominal honor) in the satellite Kingdom of Naples.

The ducal house of Fouché d'Otrante is still extant in the Kingdom of Sweden, where the dukes have lived since the 19th century. In Sweden, they are considered to be part of the unintroduced nobility.

As of 2017, the title is held by Charles-Louis Armand Fouché d'Otrante, 8th Duc d'Otrante (born in Stockholm, 14 March 1986).

See also
 French nobility
 Dukes in France
 List of French peerages

References
The Fouché Memoirs (not genuine, but they were apparently compiled, at least in part, from notes written by Fouché)
Gilbert Augustin-Thierry, Conspirateurs et gens de police; le complot de libelles (Paris, 1903) (English translation, London, 1903)
Pierre Coquelle, Napoléon et l'Angleterre (Paris, 1903, English translation, London, 1904)
 Ernest Daudet, La Police et les Chouans sous le Consulat et l'Empire (Paris, 1895)
Pierre M. Desmarest, Témoignages historiques, ou quinze ans de haute police (Paris, 1833, 2nd ed., 1900)
E. Guillon, Les Complots militaires sous le Consulat et l'Empire (Paris, 1894)
Louis Madelin, Fouché (2 vols., Paris, 1901)
E. Picard, Bonaparte et Moreau (Paris, 1905)
 H. Welschinger, Le Duc d'Enghien (Paris, 1888)
 Heraldica.org (Napoleonic heraldry)

Swedish unintroduced nobility